Syed Ahmed El-Edroos was the commander-in-chief of the Hyderabad State Forces at the time of the annexation of Hyderabad State by India in 1948.

Life
Syed Ahmed El-Edroos was of Arab Hadhrami descent. He was a Ba'Alawi Sayyed of the Bani Hashim meaning he belonged to a Hashemite family i.e. a direct descendant of the Islamic prophet Muhammad. He was commissioned in 1919. El-Edroos participated in both World Wars, serving in the 1st Hyderabad Lancers.

El-Edroos was a close confidante and trusted aide of the Nizam of Hyderabad. His brothers were also senior officers and distinguished members of the Nizam's army.

He was ready for a war , but was advised by the Nizam of Hyderabad, Mir Osman Ali Khan, not to fight and surrendered to the Indian Army forces outside of Hyderabad city so that there is no bloodshed of innocent people.

In September 1948 El-Edroos held the rank of Major-General and Commander of the State Army of Hyderabad. This numbered 6,000 men and consisted of three armored regiments, a horse cavalry regiment, 11 infantry battalions and artillery. It was supported by 18,000 poorly armed and trained irregulars. In the course of Operation Polo the Indian Army was able to scatter this mixed force in five days of fighting. General El-Edroos, who had advised the Nizam against opposing the entry of Indian forces, surrendered on 17 September.

Autobiography
His autobiography Hyderabad of the Seven Loaves was published in April 1994 and presented a historical account of the Asaf Jahi dynasty with an autobiographical sketch of the author, covering the events of Hyderabad's merger with the Indian Union. It narrates several anecdotes and facts about the city during the Nizami reign. The book also contains some rare pictures of the royal and aristocratic events that took place at the time.

See also
 Hyderabad State Forces
 Hyderabad State
 Hyderabadi Muslims
 History of Hyderabad 
 Operation Polo

References

External links
 INDIA: The Happy War, Time (magazine), 27 September 1948
 End of a State, Life (magazine), 11 October 1948

1899 births
1962 deaths
People from Hyderabad State
Hyderabad State Forces
Commanders in chief
British Indian Army generals
Indian military personnel of World War I
Indian military personnel of World War II
History of Andhra Pradesh
House of Aidarus
Hadhrami people
Indian people of Arab descent
Indian people of Yemeni descent